Ionos (formerly 1&1 IONOS and 1&1 Internet) is a web hosting company. It was founded in Germany in 1988 and is currently owned by United Internet. In addition to web hosting, it also provides domain registration, SSL certificates, email services, website builder packages, and cloud hosting, as well as virtual private servers and dedicated servers. The company has two headquarters, one in Montabaur, Germany, and the other in Philadelphia, Pennsylvania. It has approximately 4,000 employees in 40 countries, eight million customers, ten data centers, and over 90,000 servers. The company's CEO is Achim Weiss.

1&1 in Germany also operates as an ISP through , as a MVNE through 1&1 Drillisch, and as an own-brand MVNO using the O2 network.

History 
In 2000, the company changed its name to United Internet and moved its product business to 1&1 Internet AG. In the same year, 1&1 began operating in the United Kingdom, and three years later began serving United States customers. One of the company's biggest North American data centers is located in Lenexa, Kansas, which houses more than 40,000 servers.

In 2018, 1&1 merged with cloud infrastructure specialists ProfitBricks (founded by Achim Weiss) and rebranded as 1&1 Ionos. The rebrand involved a name change and a slightly redesigned Web site, but the service offerings and prices initially stayed the same. However, 1&1 Ionos introduced some new services the following year, including a personal consultant service for customers. As of September 2019, 1&1 Ionos held second place in a ranking of the market share of global Web hosting providers. In August 2021, the company changed its legal name in the US to IONOS Inc.

Weiss described the reasons for the rebrand, stating:

Eco-friendly efforts 
Ionos uses sustainable methods to reduce carbon emissions, including using 100% renewable energy in data centers and administrative buildings in the UK and Germany. The carbon is offset in other locations worldwide with green certificates or by using local renewable sources. In October 2022, IONOS opened a data center in Worcester, UK with photovoltaic panels on the roof covering up to 10% of the site's energy use.

Server outages 
In April 2019, customers in the  United Kingdom complained of lengthy server outages due to a malfunctioning uninterruptible power supply (UPS), which resulted in Web sites being offline. Call center staff could also not answer customer questions due to support tools not functioning properly. Ionos eventually fixed and addressed the issue, stating: "For when such cases occur, we have UPS systems and emergency power generators that ensure power supply is uninterrupted during an emergency. One of the five UPS systems in the affected data center suffered a technical malfunction, which meant several servers suffered a temporary loss of power and had to be restarted. As file systems had to be repaired after the power failure, some servers were not immediately available again. We're continuing to look into the cause of the error of the affected UPS system, however, all UPS systems are working properly again."

References 

Web hosting
Domain name registrars
German companies established in 1988
Companies based in Rhineland-Palatinate
Internet service providers of Germany